Pål Løkkeberg (2 August 1934 – 29 January 1998) was a Norwegian film director and screenwriter. He directed six films between 1962 and 1990. His 1967 film Liv was entered into the 17th Berlin International Film Festival.

Selected filmography
 Liv (1967)

References

External links

1934 births
1998 deaths
Norwegian film directors
Norwegian screenwriters
20th-century Norwegian writers
20th-century screenwriters